USS Ellis may refer to the following ships of the United States Navy:

 , a gunboat of the Confederate Navy acquired by the US Navy in 1862; she was grounded and blown up that same year.
 ,  launched in 1918. She served as a convoy escort in World War II and was sold in 1947.

References
 

United States Navy ship names